Ahmed Suleiman (born 18 August 1992) is a Nigerian footballer who plays as a striker.

Club career
Suleiman made his debut for Vålerenga on 29 April 2012 against Brann, they won the game 2-1. In 2013, he was loaned out to the Norwegian First Division club Ull/Kisa to July 2013. He signed a permanent deal with Ull/Kisa in August 2013 after his loan spell was over.

Career statistics

References

External links
 
 

1992 births
Living people
Sportspeople from Jos
Nigerian footballers
Vålerenga Fotball players
Ullensaker/Kisa IL players
Eliteserien players
Norwegian First Division players
Nigerian expatriate footballers
Expatriate footballers in Norway
Nigerian expatriate sportspeople in Norway
Association football forwards